Albert Clement Kellogg (September 9, 1886 – July 21, 1953) was an American Major League Baseball pitcher. He played for the Philadelphia Athletics during the  season.

References

1886 births
1953 deaths
Major League Baseball pitchers
Philadelphia Athletics players
Baseball players from Providence, Rhode Island
Providence Grays (minor league) players
Scranton Miners players
Toronto Maple Leafs (International League) players
Lexington Colts players
Butte Miners players
Salt Lake City Bees players